Kohavision (shortened to KTV, previously also Koha Vision) is a Kosovan free-to-air television channel launched on September 21, 2000. It was founded by politician and journalist Veton Surroi as part of KOHA Group, a media house currently led by Flaka Surroi. Its programming is centered towards news, with Koha e Lajmeve being the most watched news edition in the country. The broadcaster shares its press staff with the Koha Ditore, a daily newspaper. Kohavision also runs Arta News, a 24-hour news and documentary channel.

History

Kohavision was first broadcast in 2000, a year into the aftermath of the Kosovo War. It was originally developed under the direction of Veton Surroi along with the Koha Ditore newspaper. In 2003, his sister Flaka Surroi took over as the managing director. KOHA is known for owning the most read and number one newspaper in Kosovo, Koha Ditore. It all began by a 2-hour programme per day, but now it broadcasts 24/7. KOHA is a leading media house in Kosovo.

Nationally created shows broadcast by Kohavision

International shows broadcast by Kohavision

See also
 Television in Kosovo
 List of radio stations in Kosovo
 Radio Television of Kosovo
 RTV21

References

External links
Official website
YouTube channel

Television stations in Kosovo
Radio stations in Kosovo
Television channels and stations established in 2000